The Borel Hydro-monoplane (also called Bo.8) was a French seaplane produced in 1912.

Design and development
The Borel hydro-monoplane, which was developed from the 1911 Morane-Borel monoplane, was a tractor monoplane powered by an 80 hp Gnome Lambda rotary engine. The rectangular section fuselage tapered to a vertical knife-edge at the rear: at the front the longerons on each side were curved inwards, meeting  at the front engine bearer. A curved aluminium cowling covered the top of the engine, and the sides of the fuselage were covered with aluminium as far aft as the rear of the cockpit. The two seats were arranged in tandem, with the pilot sitting in front. Dual controls were fitted.  Tail surfaces consisted of a narrow-chord fixed horizontal surface with a much broader elevator with horn balances hinged to the trailing edge and a balanced rudder which extended below the sternpost and carried a small float. The main undercarriage consisted of a pair of unstepped flat-bottomed floats. Lateral control was by wing warping.

Operational history
An example was entered in the 1913 Schneider Trophy competition, but crashed during the elimination trials.

Another example, flown by George Chemet, was the winner of the 1913 Paris-Deauville race.

Operators

Corpo Aeronautico Militare

Royal Naval Air Service
Royal Flying Corps

Brazilian Naval Aviation
Military Police of Paraná State

Specifications

References

Floatplanes
Schneider Trophy
Single-engined tractor aircraft
Mid-wing aircraft
Aircraft first flown in 1912
Rotary-engined aircraft
Borel aircraft